Terminal 21 is a chain of mixed-use complexes with 4 locations in Thailand; Asok and Rama III in Bangkok, Korat, and Pattaya. The first location was opened in October 2011, located on Sukhumvit Road, by the Asoke intersection, in Watthana District of Bangkok, Thailand. The second location, Terminal 21 Korat, was opened in December 2016 and is located on Mittraphap Road in Nakhon Ratchasima Province (also called Korat). Terminal 21 Pattaya was opened in October 2018 and is located in Pattaya District of Chonburi Province. There is a proposal for Terminal 21 Rama III to be built by the Chao Phraya river in the Rama III neighbourhood of Yannawa District in Bangkok. On October 20th, 2022, Terminal 21 Rama III officially opened. 

The name "Terminal 21" is meant to represent the concept that each retail floor represents different touristic cities. The number "21" refers to Soi Sukhumvit 21 (Asok Montri Road) where its first branch in Bangkok is located. Each Terminal 21 complex consists of: a multi-storied retail area with each floors being decorated in the theme of touristic cities around the world, a SF Cinema City movie theatre, and a hotel-and-residence operated by Centre Point Hospitality, a Quality Houses PLC company.

Locations

Terminal 21 Asok 
Terminal 21 Asok opened in Bangkok in October 2011. It is located in Watthana district, situated at the Sukhumvit and Asok intersection. It links to BTS Skytrain and MRT with a skywalk, at Asok Station and Sukhumvit Station.  This mall has the longest escalators in Thailand, up to 36 meters. The retail area has a total of 10 stories anchored by an SF Cinema and a Gourmet Market (a division of The Mall Group). The Grande Centre Point hotel & residence is a 42-story, 202-meter high building.

Terminal 21 Korat 
 
Terminal 21 Korat in Nakhon Ratchasima Province (also known locally as Korat) was opened in February 2017. It is located on the Mittraphap Road by the Ratchasima-Chokchai intersection in Mueang Nakhon Ratchasima District. The retail area consists of seven floors, including a skydeck, an SF Cinema, and a Foodland supermarket.

2020 shooting

On 8 February 2020, the mall became the epicenter of a mass shooting perpetrated by a soldier. He had previously shot and killed three people at a military camp before arriving at Terminal 21 Korat via a humvee that was stolen from the military camp. A total of 30 people were killed, including the gunman, making the incident the deadliest mass shooting in Thailand's history. On the way to the mall, he shot and killed some other people.

Terminal 21 Pattaya 

Terminal 21 Pattaya was opened in Pattaya District of Chonburi Province in October 2018. It is located on the corner of the North Pattaya Road and Second Road, next to the Pla Lo Ma Roundabout. The retail area consists of 6 floors, including an SFX Cinema cinema and Foodland supermarket. Terminal 21 Pattaya also houses 32-story Grande Centre Point Pattaya hotel & residence.

Terminal 21 Rama III 
Terminal 21 Rama III was opened on October 20th, 2022, on Rama 3 Road in Bangkok’s Bang Kho Laem district. The mall contains 9 floors of shops and a parking lot for 1,658 cars across 140,000 square metres of usable space.

Retail concept 
Terminal 21 is a  one-floor-one-themed shopping mall. Each floor is decorated based on touristic cities and locations around the world; The Caribbean, Rome, Paris, Tokyo, London, Istanbul, San Francisco, and Hollywood. The decoration may differ amongst the branches of Terminal 21, while the locations being themed remain the same.

References

Shopping malls in Bangkok
Watthana district
Shopping malls established in 2011
2011 establishments in Thailand